The 2014 Dubai Sevens was the second tournament within the 2014-2015 Sevens World Series. It was held over the weekend of 5–6 December 2014 at The Sevens Stadium in Dubai, United Arab Emirates.

Format
The teams are drawn into four pools of four teams each. Each team plays every other team in their pool once. The top two teams from each pool advance to the Cup/Plate brackets. The bottom two teams from each group go to the Bowl/Shield brackets.

Teams
The 16 participating teams for the tournament:

Match officials
The match officials for the 2014 Dubai Sevens are as follows:

  Mike Adamson (Scotland)
  Federico Anselmi (Argentina)
  Nick Briant (New Zealand)
  Ben Crouse (South Africa)
  Richard Kelly (New Zealand)
  Anthony Moyes (Australia)
  Matt O'Brien (Australia)
  Marius van der Westhuizen (South Africa)

Pool Stage

Pool A

Pool B

Pool C

Pool D

Knockout stage

Shield

Bowl

Plate

Cup

References

External links
Men's Official website
Women's Official website

2014
2014–15 IRB Sevens World Series
2014 in Emirati sport
2014 in Asian rugby union
December 2014 sports events in Asia